Kissing on the Mouth is a 2005 American film directed by Joe Swanberg. The small cast served as the only crew, with the film featuring real interviews with recent college graduates and a documentary approach to the graphic sex and conversations. It is considered one of the original films of the mumblecore movement.

Plot
Ellen is sleeping with her ex-boyfriend while trying to ignore the fact that he's looking for more than just sex. Her roommate, Patrick, isn't helping matters with his secretive and jealous behavior.

Cast
 Kate Winterich – Ellen
 Joe Swanberg – Patrick
 Kevin Pittman – Chris Bucket
 Kris Swanberg – Laura
 Julie VanDeWeghe – Model

References

External links
 Official site
 

American independent films
2005 films
Films directed by Joe Swanberg
2000s erotic drama films
American erotic drama films
Mumblecore films
2005 directorial debut films
2005 drama films
2000s English-language films
2000s American films